Robinson: La Gran Aventura 2001, was the first season of the Venezuelan version of the Swedish show Expedition Robinson and it aired 2001. This season took place on an island in Panamá. During the premerge portion of the game, the teams proved to be equally strong. When it came time to merge, a twist was added to the game. This twist would allow for the person who had immunity at any given tribal council to break any tie votes. At the first post merge tribal council both the former North team and former South team members stayed loyal to their original tribes which led to a tie in votes. As Gabriel Pérez from the South team had immunity he cast his vote to eliminate former North team member Nelson. Following this initial tribal council, the South team began to pick off the remaining members of the North team one by one until only six contestants were left in the game when two of the former South team members along with the remaining North team members voted for the leader of the South team alliance Darío González which eventually led to his elimination. When it came time for the final four the contestants took part in two challenges in order to determine who would make the final two. Gabriel Pérez won the first of these challenges and advanced to the final two while Verónica Pinto was eliminated for losing the challenge. Antonio Tranchino won the second challenge and also advanced to the final two while Annalisse "Ana" Acosta lost and became the final member of the jury. Ultimately, it was Gabriel Pérez who won this season over Antonio Tranchino with a jury vote of 6-1.

Finishing order

External links
https://web.archive.org/web/20030720041101/http://www.robinsonlagranaventura.com.ve/secciones/participantes/default.htm (Official Site Archive)

V
Venezuelan reality television series
2000s reality television series
2000s Venezuelan television series
Television shows filmed in Malaysia